Qeytul (also Romanized as Qeyţūl; also known as Qeyţūr) is a village in Heydariyeh Rural District, Govar District, Gilan-e Gharb County, Kermanshah Province, Iran. At the 2006 census, its population was 591, in 129 families.

References 

Populated places in Gilan-e Gharb County